Benjamin William Aitchison (born 6 July 1999) is an English cricketer. He made his first-class debut on 1 August 2020, for Derbyshire in the 2020 Bob Willis Trophy. Prior to his debut, he had signed a rookie contract with Derbyshire. He made his List A debut on 22 July 2021, for Derbyshire in the 2021 Royal London One-Day Cup. He made his Twenty20 debut on 1 July 2022, for Derbyshire during India tour of England.

References

External links
 

1999 births
Living people
English cricketers
Cheshire cricketers
Derbyshire cricketers
Sportspeople from Southport